Mark (I) from the kindred Csák (d. after 1259) was a Hungarian noble, who served as ispán (comes) of Hont County in 1247.

He was born into the Trencsén branch of the gens Csák as the eldest son of Matthew I and Margaret from an unidentified family. According to a royal charter in 1259, Mark owned Lednic, Upper Hungary (today: Lednica, Slovakia), where he built a castle. The name of the village was first mentioned here as "Lednyche". The charter refers to him as comes Mark de Lednyche. Mark had two sons (Peter II and Stephen II) and two daughters (one of them was Maria, the wife of Ivánka Hont-Pázmány, then Zoeardus Zoárd).

Mark's descendants remained landowners near the ancient estate of the genus, Csákvár, while his brothers, Stephen I, Matthew II and Peter I, as well as the latter's sons, Matthew III and Csák acquired possessions in the north-western counties of the Kingdom of Hungary, where later Matthew III, as the most powerful oligarch, ruled de facto independently of the king and usurped royal prerogatives on his realm.

References

Sources
  Kristó, Gyula (1986). Csák Máté ("Matthew Csák"). Magyar História, Gondolat. Budapest. 
  Zsoldos, Attila (2011). Magyarország világi archontológiája, 1000–1301 ("Secular Archontology of Hungary, 1000–1301"). História, MTA Történettudományi Intézete. Budapest. 

Mark I
13th-century Hungarian people